Rick Dore is an American custom car builder, prominent in the field since the 1990s. He operates Rick Dore Kustoms in California, having first worked in Glendale, Arizona. Dore's focus is American roadsters from the 1930s through 1960s. He is the co-host, with Chuck Palumbo, of the Discovery Channel show Lords of the Car Hoards, which debuted in 2014. Metallica's James Hetfield has said “When it comes to building a Kustom car, Rick Dore is in a league of his own.”

References

External links
 Rick Dore Kustoms website

Living people
People from New York (state)
Vehicle modification people
People in the automobile industry
Television personalities from California
Artists from California
Year of birth missing (living people)